Bateman is an unincorporated community in Bastrop County, Texas, United States. It is located within the Greater Austin metropolitan area.

History
Bateman was founded in the 1880s and was named after an early settler. The Missouri-Kansas-Texas Railroad arrived in 1887 and with it expectations of growth and future prosperity. A post office was built in 1900, but closed in 1904, shifting area shipping to Round Rock. Bateman had only two businesses, and a population of 50, through the 1930s. By 2009, the population had dwindled to 12.
Ranching and a modicum of oil extraction are the town's main economic activities.

Geography
The town is located on Farm to Market Road 86, five miles southwest of Red Rock, 18 miles southwest of Bastrop and 45 miles southeast of Austin.

Education
Bateman had a two-room school in the 1930s. Today, the community is served by the Bastrop Independent School District.

References

Unincorporated communities in Bastrop County, Texas
Unincorporated communities in Texas